Cryptotermes is a genus of termites in the family Kalotermitidae. It is one of the economically most significant genera of drywood termites.

Species
There are about 70 species. Species include:
 Cryptotermes abruptus Scheffrahn and Krecek, 1998
 Cryptotermes bengalensis (Snyder, 1934)
 Cryptotermes brevis (Walker, 1853)
 Cryptotermes cavifrons Banks, 1906
 Cryptotermes ceylonicus Ranaweera, 1962
 Cryptotermes colombianus Casalla et al., 2016
 Cryptotermes cynocephalus Light, 1921
 Cryptotermes domesticus Haviland, 1898
 Cryptotermes fatulus (Light, 1935)
 Cryptotermes havilandi (Sjostedt, 1900)
 Cryptotermes longicollis (Banks, 1918)
 Cryptotermes dudleyi

References

Termite genera